Ibrahim Zarman (born 24 March 1997) is an Indonesian taekwondo practitioner. He won the gold medal in the men's –63 kg event at the 2017 Southeast Asian Games held in Kuala Lumpur, Malaysia. In 2018, he competed in the men's 63 kg event at the Asian Games in Jakarta, Indonesia without winning a medal. He was eliminated from the competition in his second match by Cho Gang-min of South Korea.

In 2016, he won one of the bronze medals in the men's −58 kg event at the Asian Taekwondo Championships in Pasay, Philippines.

He competed in the men's bantamweight event at the 2019 World Taekwondo Championships in Manchester, United Kingdom where he was eliminated in his third match by Soroush Ahmadi of Iran. Ahmadi went on to win the silver medal. A few months later, he represented Indonesia at the 2019 Military World Games held in Wuhan, China and he won Indonesia's only medal at the event: one of the bronze medals in the –63 kg event.

References

External links 
 

Living people
1997 births
Place of birth missing (living people)
Indonesian male taekwondo practitioners
Asian Taekwondo Championships medalists
Southeast Asian Games gold medalists for Indonesia
Southeast Asian Games medalists in taekwondo
Competitors at the 2017 Southeast Asian Games
Asian Games competitors for Indonesia
Taekwondo practitioners at the 2018 Asian Games
21st-century Indonesian people